This is a list of schools in Sarawak, Malaysia. It is categorised according to the variants of schools in Malaysia, and is arranged alphabetically.

Private (Chinese) High Schools
 Batu Kawa Min Lit Secondary School, Kuching 石角民立中学
 Catholic High School 诗巫公教中学
 Chung Hua Middle School No.1 古晋中华第一中学
 Chung Hua Middle School No.3 古晋中华第三中学
 Chung Hua Middle School No.4 古晋中华第四中学
 Citizen Middle School 诗巫公民中学
 Guong Ming Middle School 诗巫光民中学
 Kai Dee Middle School, Bintulu 民都鲁开智中学
 Kiang Hin Middle School 诗巫建兴中学
 Ming Lik Secondary School 泗里街民立中学
 Pei Min Middle School 美里培民中学
 Riam Road Secondary School, Miri 美里廉律中学
 Serian Public Secondary School, Samarahan 西连民众中学
 Wong Nai Siong Secondary School 诗巫黄乃裳中学

Chinese National Primary Schools
 Sekolah Jenis Kebangsaan (C) Chung Hua, Lutong, Kuching
 Sekolah Jenis Kebangsaan (C) Chung Hua, Sejijak, Kuching
 Sekolah Jenis Kebangsaan (C) St. Paul, Kuching
 Sekolah Jenis Kebangsaan (C) Chung Hua Betong, Kuching
 Sekolah Jenis Kebangsaan (C) Chung Hua, Bintulu 中华公学
 Sekolah Jenis Kebangsaan (C) Chung Hua, Tatau, Bintulu 中华达岛小学
 Sekolah Jenis Kebangsaan (C) Sebiew Chinese, Bintulu 实比河小学
 Sekolah Jenis Kebangsaan (C) Chung Hua No.2, Bintulu 中华公学二校
 Sekolah Jenis Kebangsaan (C) Siong Boon, Bintulu 尚文小学
 Sekolah Jenis Kebangsaan (C) Chung San, Sebauh, Bintulu 中山小学
 Sekolah Jenis Kebangsaan (C) Hin Hua, Song 桑县兴华小学
 Sekolah Jenis Kebangsaan (C) Hock Lam, Kapit
 Sekolah Jenis Kebangsaan (C) Bintawa, Kuching
 Sekolah Jenis Kebangsaan (C) Chung Hua Batu 10, Kuching
 Sekolah Jenis Kebangsaan (C) Chung Hua Batu 4 1/2, Kuching
 Sekolah Jenis Kebangsaan (C) Chung Hua Batu 7, Kuching
 Sekolah Jenis Kebangsaan (C) Chung Hua Batu 8 1/2, Kuching
 Sekolah Jenis Kebangsaan (C) Chung Hua Batu Kawa, Kuching
 Sekolah Jenis Kebangsaan (C) Chung Hua Kranji, Kuching
 Sekolah Jenis Kebangsaan (C) Chung Hua Lundu, Kuching
 Sekolah Jenis Kebangsaan (C) Chung Hua No. 1, Kuching 中华小学第一校
 Sekolah Jenis Kebangsaan (C) Chung Hua No. 2, Kuching 中华小学第二校
 Sekolah Jenis Kebangsaan (C) Chung Hua No. 3, Kuching 中华小学第三校
 Sekolah Jenis Kebangsaan (C) Chung Hua No. 4, Kuching 中华小学第四校
 Sekolah Jenis Kebangsaan (C) Chung Hua No. 5, Kuching 中华小学第五校
 Sekolah Jenis Kebangsaan (C) Chung Hua No. 6, Kuching 中华小学第六校
 Sekolah Jenis Kebangsaan (C) Chung Hua Sebuku, Kuching
 Sekolah Jenis Kebangsaan (C) Chung Hua Siburan, Kuching
 Sekolah Jenis Kebangsaan (C) Chung Hua Stampin, Kuching
 Sekolah Jenis Kebangsaan (C) Chung Hua Stapok, Kuching
 Sekolah Jenis Kebangsaan (C) Chung Hua Sungai Buda, Kuching
 Sekolah Jenis Kebangsaan (C) Chung Hua Sungai Lubak, Kuching
 Sekolah Jenis Kebangsaan (C) Chung Hua Sungai Moyan, Kuching
 Sekolah Jenis Kebangsaan (C) Kenyalang, Kuching
 Sekolah Jenis Kebangsaan (C) Lumba Kuda, Kuching
 Sekolah Jenis Kebangsaan (C) Sam Hap Hin, Kuching
 Sekolah Jenis Kebangsaan (C) Song Sheng Hai, Kuching
 Sekolah Jenis Kebangsaan (C) Stampin, Kuching
 Sekolah Jenis Kebangsaan (C) Sungai Apong, Kuching
 Sekolah Jenis Kebangsaan (C) Sungai Tengah, Kuching
 Sekolah Jenis Kebangsaan (C) Tapah, Kuching
 Sekolah Jenis Kebangsaan (C) Chung Hwa Lawas, Limbang
 Sekolah Jenis Kebangsaan (C) Chung Hwa Limbang
 Sekolah Jenis Kebangsaan (C) Chee Mung, Miri
 Sekolah Jenis Kebangsaan (C) Chung Hua Bakam, Miri
 Sekolah Jenis Kebangsaan (C) Chung Hua Krokop, Miri
 Sekolah Jenis Kebangsaan (C) Chung Hua Lutong, Miri
 Sekolah Jenis Kebangsaan (C) Chung Hua Miri
 Sekolah Jenis Kebangsaan (C) Chung Hua Pujut, Miri
 Sekolah Jenis Kebangsaan (C) Chung Hua Sibuti, Miri
 Sekolah Jenis Kebangsaan (C) Chung San, Miri
 Sekolah Jenis Kebangsaan (C) North, Miri
 Sekolah Jenis Kebangsaan (C) Sungai Jaong Chinese, Miri
 Sekolah Jenis Kebangsaan (C) Tukau, Miri
 Sekolah Jenis Kebangsaan (C) Chin Hua, Mukah
 Sekolah Jenis Kebangsaan (C) Chong Boon, Mukah
 Sekolah Jenis Kebangsaan (C) Chung Hua Balingian, Mukah
 Sekolah Jenis Kebangsaan (C) Chung Hua Batu 29, Samarahan
 Sekolah Jenis Kebangsaan (C) Chung Hua Batu 32, Samarahan
 Sekolah Jenis Kebangsaan (C) Chung Hua Serian, Samarahan
 Sekolah Jenis Kebangsaan (C) Chung Hua Semera, Samarahan
 Sekolah Jenis Kebangsaan (C) Chung Hua Asajaya, Samarahan
 Sekolah Jenis Kebangsaan (C) Sungai Menyan, Samarahan
 Sekolah Jenis Kebangsaan (C) Bulat, Sarikei
 Sekolah Jenis Kebangsaan (C) Chung Hien, Sarikei
 Sekolah Jenis Kebangsaan (C) Kai Chung, Sarikei
 Sekolah Jenis Kebangsaan (C) Kai Ming, Sarikei
 Sekolah Jenis Kebangsaan (C) Kwang Chien, Sarikei
 Sekolah Jenis Kebangsaan (C) Min Daik, Sarikei
 Sekolah Jenis Kebangsaan (C) Ming Tee, Sarikei
 Sekolah Jenis Kebangsaan (C) Siung Hua, Sarikei
 Sekolah Jenis Kebangsaan (C) St. Martin, Sarikei
 Sekolah Jenis Kebangsaan (C) Su Hing, Sarikei
 Sekolah Jenis Kebangsaan (C) Su Kwong, Sarikei
 Sekolah Jenis Kebangsaan (C) Su Lee, Sarikei
 Sekolah Jenis Kebangsaan (C) Su Ming, Sarikei
 Sekolah Jenis Kebangsaan (C) Tiong Ho, Sarikei
 Sekolah Jenis Kebangsaan (C) Tung Kwong, Sarikei
 Sekolah Jenis Kebangsaan (C) Wah Man, Sarikei
 Sekolah Jenis Kebangsaan (C) Bandaran Sibu No. 4, Sibu
 Sekolah Jenis Kebangsaan (C) Boi Ing, Sibu 培英小学
 Sekolah Jenis Kebangsaan (C) Chao Su, Sibu 超俗小学
 Sekolah Jenis Kebangsaan (C) Chung Cheng, Sibu 中正小学
 Sekolah Jenis Kebangsaan (C) Chung Hua, Sibu 中华小学
 Sekolah Jenis Kebangsaan (C) Chung Sing, Sibu 中心小学
 Sekolah Jenis Kebangsaan (C) Chung Ung, Sibu 崇文小学
 Sekolah Jenis Kebangsaan (C) Dung Sang, Sibu
 Sekolah Jenis Kebangsaan (C) Ek Thei, Sibu
 Sekolah Jenis Kebangsaan (C) Guong Ann, Sibu
 Sekolah Jenis Kebangsaan (C) Guong Ming, Sibu
 Sekolah Jenis Kebangsaan (C) Ing Guong, Sibu
 Sekolah Jenis Kebangsaan (C) Kai Nang, Sibu
 Sekolah Jenis Kebangsaan (C) Kiew Nang, Sibu
 Sekolah Jenis Kebangsaan (C) Kwong Hua, Sibu
 Sekolah Jenis Kebangsaan (C) Methodist Sibu
 Sekolah Jenis Kebangsaan (C) Nang Sang, Sibu
 Sekolah Jenis Kebangsaan (C) Sacred Heart Chinese Sibu
 Sekolah Jenis Kebangsaan (C) Su Lai, Sibu
 Sekolah Jenis Kebangsaan (C) Taman Rajang, Sibu
 Sekolah Jenis Kebangsaan (C) Thian Chin, Sibu
 Sekolah Jenis Kebangsaan (C) Thian Hua, Sibu
 Sekolah Jenis Kebangsaan (C) Tiong Hin, Sibu
 Sekolah Jenis Kebangsaan (C) Tung Hua, Sibu
 Sekolah Jenis Kebangsaan (C) Uk Daik, Sibu
 Sekolah Jenis Kebangsaan (C) Ung Nang, Sibu
 Sekolah Jenis Kebangsaan (C) Chung Hua Simanggang, Sri Aman

Islamic National Primary Schools 
 Sekolah Kebangsaan (A) Ibnu Khaldun, Kota Samarahan
 Sekolah Kebangsaan (A) Datuk Haji Abdul Kadir Hassan, Kuching
 Sekolah Kebangsaan (A) Bintulu
 Sekolah Kebangsaan (A) Lawas, Limbang
 Sekolah Kebangsaan (A) Miri
 Sekolah Kebangsaan (A) Sarikei
 Sekolah Kebangsaan (A) Sibu
 Sekolah Kebangsaan (A) Sri Aman

National Primary Schools

Betong Division
 Sekolah Kebangsaan Abang Abdul Kadir, Betong
 Sekolah Kebangsaan Abang Abdul Rahman, Betong
 Sekolah Kebangsaan Abang Leman, Betong
 Sekolah Kebangsaan Abang Moh Sessang, Betong
 Sekolah Kebangsaan Bungin, Betong
 Sekolah Kebangsaan Datuk Bandar, Betong
 Sekolah Kebangsaan Dit Debak, Betong
 Sekolah Kebangsaan Engkabang, Betong
 Sekolah Kebangsaan Engkudu, Betong
 Sekolah Kebangsaan Kalok Pusa, Betong
 Sekolah Kebangsaan Kampung Alit, Betong
 Sekolah Kebangsaan Kampung Emplam, Betong
 Sekolah Kebangsaan Maludam, Betong
 Sekolah Kebangsaan Semarang Pusa, Betong
 Sekolah Kebangsaan Serabang, Betong
 Sekolah Kebangsaan Spaoh, Betong
 Sekolah Kebangsaan St. Augustine Betong
 Sekolah Kebangsaan St. Christopher Debak, Betong
 Sekolah Kebangsaan St. Paul Roban, Betong
 Sekolah Kebangsaan St. Peter Saratok, Betong
 Sekolah Kebangsaan St. John Nanga Tiga, Betong
 Sekolah Kebangsaan Sungai Klampai, Betong
 Sekolah Kebangsaan To' Eman, Betong
 Sekolah Kebangsaan Orang Kaya Temenggong Tanduk, Saratok.

Bintulu Division
 Sekolah Kebangsaan Asyakirin, Bintulu
 Sekolah Kebangsaan Bintulu
 Sekolah Kebangsaan Kampung Baru Bintulu
 Sekolah Kebangsaan Kampung Jepak, Bintulu
 Sekolah Kebangsaan Kampung Nyalau, Bintulu
 Sekolah Kebangsaan Kidurong, Bintulu
 Sekolah Kebangsaan Kidurong 2, Bintulu
 Sekolah Kebangsaan Orang Kaya Mohammad, Bintulu
 Sekolah Kebangsaan Sri Samalaju, Bintulu
 Sekolah Kebangsaan St. Anthony Bintulu
 Sekolah Kebangsaan Sungai Tisang, Bintulu
 Sekolah Kebangsaan Kem Batu 18, Bintulu
 Sekolah Kebangsaan Tanjung Batu, Bintulu
 Sekolah Kebangsaan Sebauh, Bintulu
 Sekolah Kebangsaan Tatau, Bintulu

Kapit Division
 Sekolah Kebangsaan Abun Matu, Kapit
 Sekolah Kebangsaan Batu Keling, Kapit
 Sekolah Kebangsaan Cardinal Vaughan, Kapit
 Sekolah Kebangsaan Kampung Baru Kapit
 Sekolah Kebangsaan Kapit
 Sekolah Kebangsaan Methodist Kapit
 Sekolah Kebangsaan Nanga Bawai, Kapit
 Sekolah Kebangsaan Nanga Bena, Kapit
 Sekolah Kebangsaan Nanga Nyimoh, Kapit
 Sekolah Kebangsaan Nanga Sama, Kapit
 Sekolah Kebangsaan Nanga Stapang, Kapit
 Sekolah Kebangsaan Punan Ba, Kapit
 Sekolah Kebangsaan Sungai Amang, Kapit
 Sekolah Kebangsaan Temenggong Koh, Kapit
 Sekolah Kebangsaan Ulu Yong, Kapit
 Sekolah Kebangsaan Lepong Gaat, Kapit
 Sekolah Kebangsaan Lepong Menuan, Kapit
 Sekolah Kebangsaan Nanga Balang, Kapit
 Sekolah Kebangsaan Nanga Sempili, Kapit
 Sekolah Kebangsaan Rantau Panjai, Kapit

Kuching Division
 Sekolah Kebangsaan Apar, Kuching
 Sekolah Kebangsaan Astana, Kuching
 Sekolah Kebangsaan Atas, Kuching
 Sekolah Kebangsaan Bandar Samariang, Kuching
 Sekolah Kebangsaan Batu Lintang, Kuching
 Sekolah Kebangsaan Bau, Kuching
 Sekolah Kebangsaan Bumiputera, Kuching
 Sekolah Kebangsaan Buntal, Kuching
 Sekolah Kebangsaan Catholic English Kuching
 Sekolah Kebangsaan Encik Buyong, Kuching
 Sekolah Kebangsaan Garland, Kuching
 Sekolah Kebangsaan Gersik, Kuching
 Sekolah Kebangsaan Gita, Kuching
 Sekolah Kebangsaan Gita No. 2, Kuching
 Sekolah Kebangsaan Goebilt, Kuching
 Sekolah Kebangsaan Green Road, Kuching
 Sekolah Kebangsaan Grogo, Kuching
 Sekolah Kebangsaan Gumbang, Kuching
 Sekolah Kebangsaan Holy Name, Kuching
 Sekolah Kebangsaan Jalan Arang, Kuching
 Sekolah Kebangsaan Jalan Haji Baki, Kuching
 Sekolah Kebangsaan Jalan Ong Tiang Swee, Kuching
 Sekolah Kebangsaan Kampung Bobak / Sejinjang, Kuching
 Sekolah Kebangsaan Kenyalang, Kuching
 Sekolah Kebangsaan Laksamana, Kuching
 Sekolah Kebangsaan Lumba Kuda, Kuching
 Sekolah Kebangsaan Madrasah Dhak Hassan, Kuching
 Sekolah Kebangsaan Major Jeneral Datu Ibrahim, Kuching
 Sekolah Kebangsaan Matang, Kuching
 Sekolah Kebangsaan Matang Jaya, Kuching
 Sekolah Kebangsaan Matu Baru, Kuching
 Sekolah Kebangsaan Merpati Jepang, Kuching
 Sekolah Kebangsaan Opar, Kuching
 Sekolah Kebangsaan Pajar Sejingkat, Kuching
 Sekolah Kebangsaan Pangkalan Kuud, Kuching
 Sekolah Kebangsaan Paon / Temaga, Kuching
 Sekolah Kebangsaan Pedaun Bawah, Kuching
 Sekolah Kebangsaan Petra Jaya, Kuching
 Sekolah Kebangsaan Pueh, Kuching
 Sekolah Kebangsaan Pulo, Kuching
 Sekolah Kebangsaan Puruh Karu, Kuching
 Sekolah Kebangsaan Rakyat Jalan Haji Bolhassan, Kuching
 Sekolah Kebangsaan Rakyat Tupong, Kuching
 Sekolah Kebangsaan Rambungan, Kuching
 Sekolah Kebangsaan Rampangi, Kuching
 Sekolah Kebangsaan Raso, Kuching
 Sekolah Kebangsaan RPR Jalan Astana, Kuching
 Sekolah Kebangsaan Sacred Heart Padawan, Kuching
 Sekolah Kebangsaan Sampadi, Kuching
 Sekolah Kebangsaan Santubong, Kuching
 Sekolah Kebangsaan Satria Jaya, Kuching
 Sekolah Kebangsaan Sebako, Kuching
 Sekolah Kebangsaan Sebat, Kuching
 Sekolah Kebangsaan Sebiris, Kuching
 Sekolah Kebangsaan Segong, Kuching
 Sekolah Kebangsaan Sejijak, Kuching
 Sekolah Kebangsaan Selampit, Kuching
 Sekolah Kebangsaan Sematan, Kuching
 Sekolah Kebangsaan Semenggok, Kuching
 Sekolah Kebangsaan Semerah Padi, Kuching
 Sekolah Kebangsaan Senibong, Kuching
 Sekolah Kebangsaan Serasot, Kuching
 Sekolah Kebangsaan Serumbu, Kuching
 Sekolah Kebangsaan Simpang Kuda, Kuching
 Sekolah Kebangsaan Siol Kanan, Kuching
 Sekolah Kebangsaan Sira / Krian, Kuching
 Sekolah Kebangsaan Song Seng Kheng Hai, Kuching
 Sekolah Kebangsaan St. Alban Duras, Kuching
 Sekolah Kebangsaan St. Andrew Kuching
 Sekolah Kebangsaan St. Augustine Padawan, Kuching
 Sekolah Kebangsaan St. Elizabeth Padawan, Kuching
 Sekolah Kebangsaan St. Faith Sekama, Kuching
 Sekolah Kebangsaan St. George, Kuching
 Sekolah Kebangsaan St. Gregory, Kuching
 Sekolah Kebangsaan St. James Quop, Kuching
 Sekolah Kebangsaan St. John Bau, Kuching
 Sekolah Kebangsaan St. Joseph Kuching
 Sekolah Kebangsaan St. Mary Kuching
 Sekolah Kebangsaan St. Matthew, Kuching
 Sekolah Kebangsaan St. Patrick Bau, Kuching
 Sekolah Kebangsaan St. Patrick Padawan, Kuching
 Sekolah Kebangsaan St. Paul Padawan, Kuching
 Sekolah Kebangsaan St. Stephen Bau, Kuching
 Sekolah Kebangsaan St. Teresa Bau, Kuching
 Sekolah Kebangsaan St. Teresa Kuching
 Sekolah Kebangsaan St. Teresa Padungan, Kuching
 Sekolah Kebangsaan St. Thomas Kuching
 Sekolah Kebangsaan Stapok, Kuching
 Sekolah Kebangsaan Stass, Kuching
 Sekolah Kebangsaan Stunggang Melayu
 Sekolah Kebangsaan Stungkor, Kuching
 Sekolah Kebangsaan Suba Buan, Kuching
 Sekolah Kebangsaan Sungai Maong Hilir Kuching
 Sekolah Kebangsaan Sungai Pinang, Kuching
 Sekolah Kebangsaan Sungai Stutong, Kuching
 Sekolah Kebangsaan Tabuan, Kuching
 Sekolah Kebangsaan Tabuan Hilir, Kuching
 Sekolah Kebangsaan Tan Sri Datuk Haji Mohamed, Kuching
 Sekolah Kebangsaan Tanjung Bako, Kuching
 Sekolah Kebangsaan Temenggong, Kuching
 Sekolah Kebangsaan Buso, Bau
 Sekolah Kebangsaan Tringgus, Kuching

Limbang Division
 Sekolah Kebangsaan, Limbang
 Sekolah Kebangsaan, Limbang
 Sekolah Kebangsaan Bandar Limbang
 Sekolah Kebangsaan Batu Empat, Limbang
 Sekolah Kebangsaan, Limbang
 Sekolah Kebangsaan Kerangan, Limbang
Sekolah Kebangsaan Ladang Baru, Limbang
 Sekolah Kebangsaan Limbang
 Sekolah Kebangsaan Limpaki, Limbang
 Sekolah Kebangsaan Long Napir, Limbang
 Sekolah Kebangsaan Long Tukon, Limbang
 Sekolah Kebangsaan Long Tuma, Limbang
 Sekolah Kebangsaan Melayu Pusat, Limbang
 Sekolah Kebangsaan Menuang, Limbang
 Sekolah Kebangsaan Meritam, Limbang
 Sekolah Kebangsaan Pengkalan Jawa, Limbang
 Sekolah Kebangsaan Pusat Lawas, Limbang
 Sekolah Kebangsaan Kampung Pahlawan, Limbang
 Sekolah Kebangsaan St. Edmund, Limbang
 Sekolah Kebangsaan Batu Danau, Limbang
 Sekolah Kebangsaan Sungai Poyan, Limbang
 Sekolah Kebangsaan Telahak, Limbang
 Sekolah Kebangsaan Tiga Kampung, Limbang
 Sekolah Kebangsaan Ulu Lubai, Limbang

Miri Division
 Sekolah Kebangsaan Anchi, Miri
 Sekolah Kebangsaan Batu Niah, Miri
 Sekolah Kebangsaan Bekenu, Miri
 Sekolah Kebangsaan Dato Sharif Hamid, Miri
 Sekolah Kebangsaan Good Shepherd, Miri
 Sekolah Kebangsaan Jalan Bintang, Miri
 Sekolah Kebangsaan Kampung Bakam, Miri
 Sekolah Kebangsaan Kampung Luak, Miri
 Sekolah Kebangsaan Selanyau, Miri
 Sekolah Kebangsaan Kelapa Sawit No. 1, Miri
 Sekolah Kebangsaan Kita, Miri
 Sekolah Kebangsaan Kuala Baram Ii, Miri
 Sekolah Kebangsaan Lambir Village, Miri
 Sekolah Kebangsaan Lepong Ajai, Miri
 Sekolah Kebangsaan Long Ikang, Miri
 Sekolah Kebangsaan Long Lapok, Miri
 Sekolah Kebangsaan Long Laput, Miri
 Sekolah Kebangsaan Long Loyang, Miri
 Sekolah Kebangsaan Long ,Miri
 Sekolah Kebangsaan Long Naah, Miri
 Sekolah Kebangsaan Long Pillah, Miri
 Sekolah Kebangsaan Long Teran Kanan, Miri
 Sekolah Kebangsaan Lutong, Miri
 Sekolah Kebangsaan Merbau, Miri
 Sekolah Kebangsaan Pengarah Enteri, Miri
 Sekolah Kebangsaan Poyut, Miri
 Sekolah Kebangsaan Pujut Corner, Miri
 Sekolah Kebangsaan Pulau Melayu, Miri
 Sekolah Kebangsaan Riam Batu Dua, Miri
 Sekolah Kebangsaan Senadin, Miri
 Sekolah Kebangsaan South, Miri
 Sekolah Kebangsaan St. Columba, Miri
 Sekolah Kebangsaan St. Joseph, Miri
 Sekolah Kebangsaan St. Pius Long San, Miri
 Sekolah Kebangsaan Sungai Entulang, Miri
 Sekolah Kebangsaan Sungai Seputi, Miri
 Sekolah Kebangsaan Sungai Saeh, Niah (Miri)
 Sekolah Kebangsaan Temala Kem Plywood, Miri
 Sekolah Kebangsaan Temenggong Datuk Muip, Miri
 Sekolah Kebangsaan Tudan, Miri

Mukah Division
 Sekolah Kebangsaan Abang Gesa, Mukah
 Sekolah Kebangsaan Bawang / Tian, Mukah
 Sekolah Kebangsaan Camporan Daro, Mukah
 Sekolah Kebangsaan Datu Pengiran Mohamad, Mukah
 Sekolah Kebangsaan Datuk Awang Udin, Mukah
 Sekolah Kebangsaan Kampung Balan, Mukah
 Sekolah Kebangsaan Kampung Igan, Mukah
 Sekolah Kebangsaan Kampung Jebungan, Mukah
 Sekolah Kebangsaan Kampung Klid/Plajau, Dalat, Mukah
 Sekolah Kebangsaan Kampung Petanak, Mukah
 Sekolah Kebangsaan Kampung Seberang, Mukah
 Sekolah Kebangsaan Kampung Senau, Mukah
 Sekolah Kebangsaan Kampung Tanam, Mukah
 Sekolah Kebangsaan Kampung Tebaang, Mukah
 Sekolah Kebangsaan Kampung Tellian, Mukah
 Sekolah Kebangsaan Kuala Kenyana, Mukah
 Sekolah Kebangsaan Kuala Matu, Mukah
 Sekolah Kebangsaan Orang Kaya Selair Matu, Mukah
 Sekolah Kebangsaan Mukah
 Sekolah Kebangsaan Nangar, Mukah
 Sekolah Kebangsaan Orang Kaya Muda, Mukah
 Sekolah Kebangsaan Orang Kaya Sergunim, Mukah
 Sekolah Kebangsaan Semop, Mukah
 Sekolah Kebangsaan SLDB No. 1, Mukah
Sekolah Kebangsaan St. John Kampung Meradong
Sekolah Jenis Kebangsaan (C) Chong Boon, Mukah
 Sekolah Kebangsaan St. Jude, Mukah
 Sekolah Kebangsaan St. Kevin Sungai Kut, Mukah
 Sekolah Kebangsaan Sungai Kut Tengah, Mukah
 Sekolah Kebangsaan St. Patrick Mukah
 Sekolah Kebangsaan Sungai Nai, Mukah
 Sekolah Kebangsaan Sungai Pinang, Mukah
 Sekolah Kebangsaan Sungai Ud, Mukah

Samarahan Division
 Sekolah Kebangsaan Abang Kadir Gedong, Samarahan
 Sekolah Kebangsaan Abang Man, Samarahan
 Sekolah Kebangsaan Asajaya Ulu, Samarahan
 Sekolah Kebangsaan Balai Ringin, Samarahan
 Sekolah Kebangsaan Dato Mohd Musa, Samarahan
 Sekolah Kebangsaan Dato Traoh Muara Tuang, Samarahan
 Sekolah Kebangsaan Endap, Samarahan
 Sekolah Kebangsaan Engkaroh, Samarahan
 Sekolah Kebangsaan Entayan, Samarahan
 Sekolah Kebangsaan Gahat Mawang, Samarahan
 Sekolah Kebangsaan Gemang, Samarahan
 Sekolah Kebangsaan Haji Kelali Semera, Samarahan
 Sekolah Kebangsaan Iboi / Pelanduk, Samarahan
 Sekolah Kebangsaan Jalan Muara Tuang, Samarahan
 Sekolah Kebangsaan Jemukan, Samarahan
 Sekolah Kebangsaan Kampung Baru Samarahan
 Sekolah Kebangsaan Krangan, Samarahan
 Sekolah Kebangsaan Lobang Batu, Samarahan
 Sekolah Kebangsaan Lubok Antu Reban, Samarahan
 Sekolah Kebangsaan Melansai, Samarahan
 Sekolah Kebangsaan Mentu Tapu, Samarahan
 Sekolah Kebangsaan Meranek, Samarahan
 Sekolah Kebangsaan Pati, Samarahan
 Sekolah Kebangsaan Pinang, Samarahan
 Sekolah Kebangsaan Plaman Baki / Menaul, Samarahan
 Sekolah Kebangsaan Rebak, Samarahan
 Sekolah Kebangsaan Rituh, Samarahan
 Sekolah Kebangsaan Sambir, Samarahan
 Sekolah Kebangsaan Sampun Tebun, Samarahan
 Sekolah Kebangsaan Serian, Samarahan
 Sekolah Kebangsaan St. John Taee, Samarahan
 Sekolah Kebangsaan St. Jude Bunan, Samarahan
 Sekolah Kebangsaan St. Martin, Samarahan
 Sekolah Kebangsaan St. Michael, Samarahan
 Sekolah Kebangsaan St. Patrick Tangga, Samarahan
 Sekolah Kebangsaan St. Raymond Mujat, Samarahan
 Sekolah Kebangsaan St. Teresa Serian, Samarahan
 Sekolah Kebangsaan Sungai Rimu, Samarahan
 Sekolah Kebangsaan Tambirat, Samarahan
 Sekolah Kebangsaan Tanjong Apong, Samarahan
 Sekolah Kebangsaan Tarat, Samarahan
 Sekolah Kebangsaan Tebedu, Samarahan
 Sekolah Kebangsaan Tebelu, Samarahan
 Sekolah Kebangsaan Tegelam, Samarahan
 Sekolah Kebangsaan Wira Jaya, Samarahan

Sarikei Division
 Sekolah Kebangsaan Abang Amin, Sarikei
 Sekolah Kebangsaan Abang Haji Matahir, Sarikei
 Sekolah Kebangsaan Bandar Bintangor, Sarikei
 Sekolah Kebangsaan Methodist Anglo-Chinese, Sarikei
 Sekolah Kebangsaan Nanga Kara, Sarikei
 Sekolah Kebangsaan Nanga Pakan, Sarikei
 Sekolah Kebangsaan Nanga Sengaih, Sarikei
 Sekolah Kebangsaan Rentap, Sarikei
 Sekolah Kebangsaan St. Alphonsus, Sarikei
 Sekolah Kebangsaan St. Anne, Sarikei
 Sekolah Kebangsaan St. Augustine Meradong, Sarikei
 Sekolah Kebangsaan Sungai Kawi, Sarikei
 Sekolah Kebangsaan Sungai Mador, Sarikei
 Sekolah kebangsaan Sarikei, Sarikei
 Sekolah Kebangsaan Sungai Paoh, Sarikei
 Sekolah Kebangsaan Adin, Sarikei

Sibu Division
 Sekolah Kebangsaan Abang Ali, Sibu
 Sekolah Kebangsaan Batu 10 Jalan Oya, Sibu
 Sekolah Kebangsaan Batu 15, Sibu
 Sekolah Kebangsaan Dijih, Selangau, Sibu
 Sekolah Kebangsaan Hua Hin English, Sibu
 Sekolah Kebangsaan Kampung Bahagia Jaya, Sibu
 Sekolah Kebangsaan Methodist Sibu
 Sekolah Kebangsaan Nanga Dap, Sibu
 Sekolah Kebangsaan Nanga Machan, Sibu
 Sekolah Kebangsaan Nanga Tada, Sibu
 Sekolah Kebangsaan Penghulu Imban, Sekuau, Sibu 
 Sekolah Kebangsaan Perbandaran Sibu No. 4, Sibu
 Sekolah Kebangsaan Sacred Heart Sibu
 Sekolah Kebangsaan Sedc, Sibu
 Sekolah Kebangsaan Sentosa Sibu
 Sekolah Kebangsaan Sibu Bandaran No. 2
 Sekolah Kebangsaan Sibu Bandaran No. 3
 Sekolah Kebangsaan Sibu Jaya, Sibu
 Sekolah Kebangsaan St. Mary Sibu
 Sekolah Kebangsaan St. Rita Sibu
 Sekolah Kebangsaan Sungai Anak, Selangau, Sibu
 Sekolah Kebangsaan Sungai Naman, Sibu
 Sekolah Kebangsaan Sungai Sepiring / Sungai Tepus, Sibu
 Sekolah Kebangsaan Ulu Ranan, Sibu
 Sekolah Kebangsaan Ulu Sungai Merah
 Sekolah Kebangsaan Bandaran Sibu No. 4, Sibu

Sri Aman Division
 Sekolah Kebangsaan Abang Aing, Sri Aman
 Sekolah Kebangsaan Batang Ai, Sri Aman
 Sekolah Kebangsaan Engkilili No. 1, Sri Aman
 Sekolah Kebangsaan Engkranji, Sri Aman
 Sekolah Kebangsaan Kem Pakit, Sri Aman
 Sekolah Kebangsaan Kem Skrang, Sri Aman
 Sekolah Kebangsaan Keranggas, Sri Aman
 Sekolah Kebangsaan Lubok Antu, Sri Aman
 Sekolah Kebangsaan Melugu, Sri Aman
 Sekolah Kebangsaan Pantu, Sri Aman
 Sekolah Kebangsaan Selepong, Sri Aman
 Sekolah Kebangsaan Sri Aman
 Sekolah Kebangsaan St. Luke Sri Aman
 Sekolah Kebangsaan Tanjung Bijat, Sri Aman
 Sekolah Kebangsaan Temudok Kem, Sri Aman

National-type (Chinese) secondary schools

Islamic religious national secondary schools

Secondary education: Sekolah Menengah Kebangsaan (SMK)

Sekolah Berasrama Penuh
 Sekolah Menengah Sains Kuching
 Sekolah Menengah Sains Miri
 Sekolah Menengah Sains Kuching Utara
 Sekolah Seni Malaysia Sarawak

Technical National High Schools
 Sekolah Menengah Teknik Betong
 Sekolah Menengah Teknik Bintulu
 Sekolah Menengah Teknik Kuching
 Sekolah Menengah Teknik Matang
 Sekolah Menengah Teknik Miri
 Sekolah Menengah Teknik Sejingkat
 Sekolah Menengah Teknik Sibu

International Schools 
 Bintulu International School, Bintulu
 Borneo International School, Kuching
 Lodge International School, Kuching
 Kidurong International School, Bintulu
 Tunku Putra School, Kuching
 Tenby International School, Miri
 Woodlands International School, Sibu

Private Schools (Primary)
 Sekolah Rendah Lodge (Lodge National Primary School), Kuching
 Sekolah Rendah Sri Tenby, Miri
 Sekolah Rendah Sri Mawar, Miri
 Sekolah Rendah Sri Mulia, Miri
 St Joseph's Private Primary School, Kuching
 Sunny Hill Primary School, Kuching
 Sekolah Rendah Ma'had Tahfiz Tun Abdul-Rahman Ya'kub (MATTARY), Kuching
 Sekolah Rendah Ayer Manis, Serian

Private Schools (Secondary)
 Sekolah Menengah Lodge (Lodge National Secondary School), Kuching
 Sekolah Menengah Tunku Putra (Tunku Putra Secondary School), Kuching
 Sekolah Menengah Swasta Sunny Hill, Kuching
 St. Joseph's Private Secondary School, Kuching
 Sekolah Menengah Swasta Mizuhashi, Miri (will be launched)

Kindergartens 
 Tadika Miri Chinese
 Tadika Sri Mawar, Miri
 Tadika Inspirasi Ceria, Miri.
 Petronita Kindergarten, Kidurong, Bintulu (for Petronas staffs' children only)
 An-Nur Kindergarten, Kidurong, Bintulu
 Tadika Astana, Miri.
 Tadika St Edmund, Limbang
 Tadika Lodge (Lodge Kindergarten), Kuching

College Schools 
 Kolej Datu Patinggi Abang Haji Abdillah, Kuching
 Kolej Tun Datu Tuanku Haji Bujang, Miri
 Sunny Hills, Kuching

Maktab Rendah Sains Mara 
 Maktab Rendah Sains Mara, Kuching
 Maktab Rendah Sains Mara, Betong
 Maktab Rendah Sains Mara, Mukah

Sarawak